Sunder Sham Arora (born 15 June 1958) is an Indian politician and a member of INC. In 2017, he was elected as the member of the Punjab Legislative Assembly from Hoshiarpur. He was arrested by vigilance while attempting to bribe officials in corruption cases.

Constituency
He won the Hoshiarpur seat on an INC ticket, he beat the member of the Punjab Legislative Assembly Tikshan Sud of the BJP by over 11233 votes.

References

Living people
Indian politicians
Punjab, India MLAs 2017–2022
1978 births
Indian National Congress politicians
People from Punjab, India
Indian National Congress politicians from Punjab, India